Men of the Plains is a 1936 American Western film directed by Robert F. Hill and written by Robert Emmett Tansey. The film stars Rex Bell, Joan Barclay, George Ball, Charles King, Forrest Taylor and Roger Williams. The film was released on September 29, 1936, by Colony Pictures.

Plot

Cast          
Rex Bell as Jim Dean / Tom Porter
Joan Barclay as Laura Long
George Ball as Billy Sawyer
Charles King as Johnson
Forrest Taylor as James Travis 
Roger Williams as Cole
Ed Cassidy as J.J. Gray
John Elliott as Dad Baxter
Lafe McKee as Marshal Ed Green
John Cowell as Lucky Gordon

References

External links
 

1936 films
1930s English-language films
American Western (genre) films
1936 Western (genre) films
Films directed by Robert F. Hill
American black-and-white films
1930s American films